Law and Justice Youth Forum, abbreviated to FM PiS, is the youth wing of the Polish conservative party Law and Justice.

It was founded in 2002.  Its current chairman is Michał Moskal.

FM PiS is a member of the European Young Conservatives, whose congress it hosted in Warsaw in May 2012.

See also
Politics of Poland

References

External links
  Forum Młodych page on the Law and Justice official website

Law and Justice
Youth wings of political parties in Poland
Youth wings of conservative parties
Youth wings of Alliance of Conservatives and Reformists in Europe member parties